The 1997–98 Scottish League Cup was the 52nd staging of Scotland's second most prestigious football knockout competition. The competition was won by Celtic, who defeated Dundee United 3–0 in the Final. The Final was played at Ibrox Stadium because Hampden Park was being redeveloped, work which was completed in time for the 1999 Scottish Cup Final.

First round

Second round

Third round

Quarter-finals

Semi-finals

Final

External links
Scottish League Cup 1997/1998

Scottish League Cup seasons
League Cup